is a Japanese nordic combined skier who has been competing since 2005. He won a gold medal in the 4 × 5 km team event at the FIS Nordic World Ski Championships 2009 in Liberec and earned his best individual finish of 31st in the 7.5 km sprint at Sapporo in 2007.

Career
Competing in two Winter Olympics, Watabe earned his best finish of sixth in the 4 x 5 team event at Vancouver in 2010 and had his best individual finish of ninth in the 10 km individual large hill event at those same games.

His best World Cup finish was third at a 10 km individual large hill event in Finland in March 2010, until the 2011/2012 season when he started to win World Cup competitions.

During the 2014 Sochi Winter Olympics, Akito Watabe took home the Silver Medal in the Nordic Combined Individual Gundersen NH / 10 km, Cross-Country event.

In the 2018 Olympics, Watabe won the silver medal in the normal hill/10 km Nordic combined competition.

In the 2022 Olympics, Akito Watabe won two bronze medals in the large hill/10 km and Team large hill Nordic combined competition.

Personal life
His wife, Yurie Watabe, is a Japanese freestyle skier, who specialises in halfpipe. Akito's younger brother, Yoshito also competes in Nordic Combined World Cup.

World Cup wins

References

External links

1988 births
Japanese male Nordic combined skiers
Living people
Nordic combined skiers at the 2006 Winter Olympics
Nordic combined skiers at the 2010 Winter Olympics
Nordic combined skiers at the 2014 Winter Olympics
Nordic combined skiers at the 2018 Winter Olympics
Nordic combined skiers at the 2022 Winter Olympics
Olympic Nordic combined skiers of Japan
FIS Nordic World Ski Championships medalists in Nordic combined
Olympic silver medalists for Japan
Olympic bronze medalists for Japan
Medalists at the 2014 Winter Olympics
Medalists at the 2018 Winter Olympics
Medalists at the 2022 Winter Olympics
Olympic medalists in Nordic combined
21st-century Japanese people